Hlavenec is a municipality and village in Prague-East District in the Central Bohemian Region of the Czech Republic. It has about 400 inhabitants.

Sights

The most important monument is the memorial of Emperor Charles VI made by Matthias Braun in 1724–1725.

References

Villages in Prague-East District